Level Up may refer to:

Film and TV
Level Up (2016 film), a British thriller film
Level Up (American TV series), a Cartoon Network live action series
Level Up (2011 film), the movie pilot for the Cartoon Network series
Level Up (British TV series), a UK children's TV programme that was broadcast on CBBC
"Level Up", the twentieth episode and Season 2 finale of Freeform's 2018 live series of Cloak & Dagger
Level Up (South Korean TV series), a 2019 South Korean romantic comedy

Music
"Level Up" (Ciara song), a 2018 song by American singer Ciara
"Level Up" (Sway song), a 2012 song by Ghanaian-British musician Sway 
Level Up, album by Stevie Stone
"Level Up", a song by Burna Boy from his 2020 album Twice as Tall

Other uses
Level Up (comics), a 2011 graphic novel written by Gene Luen Yang and drawn by Thien Pham

See also
 Levelling up (disambiguation)